The 2004 National Soccer League Grand Final was held on 4 April 2004 between Parramatta Power and Perth Glory at Parramatta Stadium. Parramatta Power had gained home-ground advantage by beating Perth Glory in the major semi final, while Perth earned their place with a win over Adelaide United in the preliminary final. Perth won the match 1–0, with Nik Mrdja scoring a golden goal in extra time.

Background
The Australian Soccer Association (ASA) had decided that this would be the last National Soccer League season ahead of the launch of the provisionally-named Australian Premier League (APL) in 2005.

Route to the final 

The two teams were the clear standouts with Perth finishing the season first and Parramatta six points behind. As the top two teams, they earned the right to advance to the second week of the finals series. In the major semi-final, held over two legs at Parramatta Stadium and Perth Oval, Parramatta defeated Perth 6–2 on aggregate to advance to the grand final. Perth defeated Adelaide United in the preliminary final 5–0 at Subiaco Oval to earn the right to face the Power again. After initially suggesting that they might relinquish home-ground advantage to the Glory, the Power eventually decided to host the grand final at Parramatta.

League Standings

Finals Bracket

Match

Summary
The match took place in heavy rain which led to a smaller than expected crowd and affected the pitch.

Perth had the first real chance on goal in the 14th minute with Damian Mori having a shot from within the six-yard box saved by Clint Bolton, the Power goalkeeper. A Peter Zorbas cross after 23 minutes was spilt by Perth goalkeeper Jason Petkovic, however Power forward Ante Milicic was unable to capitalise. A promising Glory attack was thwarted in the 29th minute with a ball in the penalty area stopping in the mud near the line.

With conditions improving in the second half, Power midfielder Ahmad Elrich put in a cross to Milicic who shot wide. Shortly after, Mori again missed from just outside the six-yard box with only the keeper between him and the goal. In the 74th minute, Power forward Sasho Petrovski shot the ball wide after doing to move past his opponent. 

With regulation time expiring, the teams began extra time with the Golden goal rule in effect. Mori missed a clear chance to win the grand final five minutes into extra time after Peter Zorbas slipped while trying to clear the ball from the penalty area. 

Nik Mrdja, who had been an 82nd minute substitute for striker Bobby Despotovski, ended the match eight minutes into the first period of extra time with a low shot past Power goalkeeper Bolton.

Details

Post match
Power midfielder Ahmad Elrich was presented the Joe Marston Medal for best player of the grand final by Joe Marston.

References

2004 in Australian soccer
NSL Grand Finals
Soccer in Sydney
Perth Glory FC matches